Irish Distillers is a subsidiary of the French drinks conglomerate Pernod Ricard. It is the largest distiller of Irish whiskey, distilling popular brands such as Jameson and Powers, in addition to premium whiskeys such as Redbreast and Midleton Very Rare. In addition to whiskey, Irish Distillers also produces a number of other spirit products such as gin and vodka.

History
Irish Distillers Group was formed as Irish Distillers Limited (IDL) in 1966, when a merger took place between three Irish whiskey distilleries, Cork Distilleries Company, John Jameson & Son and John Power & Son. In an attempt to reverse the decline in Irish whiskey sales, the board of directors decided to close their existing distilleries in Cork and Dublin, and to consolidate production at a new purpose-built facility. A site alongside the existing distillery in Midleton, Co. Cork was chosen as the location for the new distillery, as there was no room for expansion alongside the Dublin distilleries.

In 1972, Bushmills, the only other whiskey distillery in operation in Ireland at the time, joined the group, giving Irish Distillers complete control over all whiskey production on the island of Ireland. One Friday in July 1975, production ceased at the Old Midleton Distillery and began the next Monday morning at the new Midleton complex, with distillation at the two Dublin distilleries come to an end a year later. The distillery at Bushmills, County Antrim remained in operation.

The Old Midleton Distillery and Jameson's Bow Street Distillery have since reopened as visitors' centres. In contrast, much of Powers John's Lane distillery has been demolished, with the remaining buildings, now protected structures, forming part of the National College of Art and Design.

Following a hostile takeover attempt from Grand Metropolitan, Allied-Lyons and Guinness, Irish Distillers was the subject of a white knight takeover by Pernod Ricard in June 1988.

In 2005, Bushmills was sold to rival drinks giant Diageo for £200 million. In addition, in 2016, the Paddy Irish whiskey brand was sold to Sazerac, though as part of the sale agreement, production of the whiskey is to continue at the Midleton Distillery.

Products

 Jameson Whiskey
 Powers Whiskey
 Paddy Whiskey - sold to Sazerac in 2016
 Redbreast Whiskey
 Midleton Whiskey
 Green Spot, Yellow Spot, Red Spot, Blue Spot, Gold Spot - produced exclusively for Mitchell & Son Wine Merchants
 Method and Madness Whiskey

Beyond whiskey, the distillery also produces:

 Huzzar Vodka
 Cork Dry Gin
 Method and Madness Gin
 Eight Degrees Brewing Company

See also
 Cooley Distillery
 Irish Whiskey
 The Old Jameson Distillery

References

External links
 Irish Distillers

Distilleries in the Republic of Ireland
Food and drink companies based in Dublin (city)
Manufacturing companies based in Dublin (city)
Pernod Ricard brands
1966 establishments in Ireland